The SMU Mustangs men's basketball team represents Southern Methodist University (SMU) in Dallas, Texas and currently competes in the American Athletic Conference of NCAA Division I college basketball. The Mustangs are currently coached by Rob Lanier. In 104 years of basketball, SMU's record is 1,377–1,237. SMU has reached one Final Four, has made 12 NCAA Tournament Appearances, won 16 Conference Championships, had 11 All-Americans, and 23 NBA Draft selections.

SMU finished the 2016–17 season with a 30–5 record, and won their second conference title in three years. They set the school record for single season wins, and returned to the NCAA Tournament following a postseason ban in the 2015–16 season.

History

1916: The Beginning

1916 was the inaugural season of SMU basketball where it went 12–2. SMU joined the Southwest Conference in the 1918–19 season. SMU won its first two conference titles in 1935 and 1937.

1955-1967: The Doc Hayes Era (Golden Era of Pony Hoops)

Doc Hayes took over as SMU's head coach in 1947. By 1955 Hayes had SMU in the NCAA Tournament for the first time in school history advancing to the Sweet Sixteen and had won their first conference title in almost 20 years. The four year stretch from 1955–58, SMU went 77–28, won four consecutive Southwest Conference championships, and reached 3 Sweet Sixteen's while also reaching the school's only ever Final Four in the 1955-56 season, led by All-American Jim Krebs. SMU during the Doc Hayes era won 8 SWC championships and reached the NCAA tournament 6 times including Final Four and Elite Eight appearances. Doc Hayes retired after the 1967 season with a final record of 298–191 (.609) at SMU.

1968-1993: The Fall to Mediocrity 
Following Doc Hayes, SMU basketball fell down into a period of mediocrity with some sprinkled success highlighted by SMU greats Jon Koncak, Ira Terrell, and Gene Phillips. Though the Bob Prewitt and Sonny Allen eras were largely unsuccessful and only produced one Southwest Conference Championship during a stretch between 1968 and 1980 the program looked to be back on the rise during the Dave Bliss era. Bliss and star big man Jon Koncak led SMU to 3 NCAA tournament appearances and an NIT appearance. The Dave Bliss era was highlighted by his final season where SMU went 28–7 winning the SWC regular season and tournament championships and making it to the Second round of the NCAA Tournament. SMU would win the SWC Championship and reach the NCAA tournament one more time in the 1993 season under John Shumate, however, this was the start of the Dark Ages of SMU basketball.

1994-2012: The Dark Ages 
This period was the dark age for SMU basketball. From 1994 to 2012 SMU had just seven winning seasons and did not win any conference titles or reach the NCAA tournament. The Mustangs only reached the NIT and CIT once each during these nineteen years.

2012-2016: The Larry Brown Era 
The reemergence of SMU basketball occurred when Hall of Fame coach Larry Brown took over the Mustangs in the 2012 season, coinciding with the $48 million renovation of Moody Coliseum. By his second season, he had led SMU to a 27–10 record, and to a championship appearance in the NIT. In his third season, (2014–15) led by Nic Moore, SMU won its first conference title in 22 years (regular season and tournament champions), and returned to the NCAA tournament, losing a controversial game to UCLA on a goaltending call. In the 2015–16 season, SMU was banned from postseason play due to NCAA violations, but still managed to start the season with an unprecedented 18–0 record, peaking at the #8 spot in the AP Poll, and finish the season at 25–5. It was SMU's third straight 25+ win season. In the summer of 2016, Brown stepped down as SMU's basketball coach unexpectedly, finishing with a record of 85–39(.685). He currently holds the third-highest W-L percentage of any head coach in SMU basketball history.

2016-Present: Maintaining Success (Post Larry Brown) 

Tim Jankovich took over in the summer of 2016 following the departure of Larry Brown. In his first full season as SMU's head coach, SMU achieved a 30–4 overall record, including a 17-1 in-conference record, and finished ranked #11 in the AP Poll. The Mustangs won the 2016–17  American Athletic Conference regular season and conference tournament titles, and received a bid to the NCAA tournament as a 6 seed, where they were upset by 11th seeded USC by one point in the opening round. Following the season, Junior standout Semi Ojeleye announced that he would not be returning for his final year, joining seniors Sterling Brown and 
Ben Moore in entering the NBA draft where both Ojeleye and Brown were selected 37th and 46th overall, respectively. Ben Moore spent 27 games with the G League team, Fort Wayne Mad Ants where he averaged 11.4 points per game and 6.7 rebounds per game. He was recently signed to a two way contract with the Indiana Pacers on January 12, 2018. This marks the first time an SMU player has been drafted since 2001. This is also the first time SMU has ever had 3 players join their first NBA rosters in the same season, topping the previous high of 1.

SMU career records

Season-by-season results 

Under Larry Brown and Tim Jankovich:

Postseason

Complete NCAA tournament results
The Mustangs have appeared in 12 NCAA Tournaments. Their combined record is 10–14.

The NCAA began seeding the tournament with the 1978 edition.

NIT results
The Mustangs have appeared in five National Invitation Tournaments (NIT). Their combined record is 5–5.

CIT results
The Mustangs have appeared in one CollegeInsider.com Postseason Tournament (CIT). Their record is 3–1.

CCA/NCIT results
The Mustangs appeared in one of the two National Commissioners Invitational Tournaments, in 1974, and went 0-1.

Notable players

Summary

Mustangs and the NBA

NBA draft picks

Notable undrafted players

Mustangs in international leagues

Jalen Jones (born 1993), player for Hapoel Haifa in the Israeli Basketball Premier League
 Ike Ofoegbu (born 1984), American-Nigerian Israeli Premier Basketball League player

Awards
AAC Player of the Year

AAC Tournament MVP

AAC Sixth Man of the Year

WAC Player of the Year

SWC Player of the Year

All-Americans

SMU has had 12 All-Americans:

2016-2017 Semi Ojeleye (Jr.)(AP All-American Honorable Mention); 2015–16 Nic Moore (Sr.) (AP All-American Honorable Mention); 2014–15 Nic Moore (Jr.) (AP All-American Honorable Mention); 2002–03 Quinton Ross (Sr.); 1984–85 Jon Koncak (Sr.) (2nd team – Consensus); 1975–76 Ira Terrell (Sr.); 1970–71 Gene Phillips (Sr.); 1969–70 Gene Phillips (Jr.); 1959–60 Max Williams (Sr.); 1956–57 Jim Krebs (Sr.) (1st team – Consensus); 1955–56 Jim Krebs (Jr.); 1934–35 Whitey Baccus (Sr.)

References

External links